Rob Milligan (born 17 April 1990 in Northampton, Northamptonshire, England) is a former a rugby union player for Northampton Saints in the Guinness Premiership. He played as a number 8. Like many Northampton Saints players, he began his career at Northampton Old Scouts RFC, like his former team-mate Courtney Lawes.

He attended Rugby School as a day pupil in Town House, was head of school and captained their first XV.

Milligan made his only Saints appearance in an EDF Energy Cup match against Bristol Rugby.

Milligan retired from rugby after the 2008-09 season due to medical advice. He has decided to pursue a career in rowing.

References

Northampton Old Scouts RFC

External links
Northampton Saints profile
England profile

1990 births
Living people
English rugby union players
Northampton Saints players
People educated at Wellingborough School
People educated at Rugby School
Rugby union players from Northampton
Rugby union number eights